The Ottoman-Saudi War  also known as the Ottoman/Egyptian-Saudi War (1811–1818) was fought from early 1811 to 1818, between the Ottoman Empire and the Emirate of Diriyah, the First Saudi State, resulting in the destruction of the latter.

Background
Although Muhammad Ibn 'Abd al-Wahhab, the leader of the Wahhabi movement, had indirectly expressed anti-Ottoman sentiments in his letters, he had decided not to publicly challenge the legitimacy of the empire as a precautionary measure. He also had not publicly acknowledged the Caliphate claim of the Ottomans, an assertion which they proclaimed after they suffered territorial losses at the hands of the Russian Empire in the 1770s. In the movement's first decades, the Wahhabis were ambiguous in offering a clear political view on the Ottomans. However, Ibn 'Abd al-Wahhab had theologically repudiated the Ottomans, criticising the religious conditions of Ottoman provinces and he also asserted that Shari'ah (Islamic law) was unenforced by the authorities. The Wahhabis offered an alternative religious and political model to that of the Ottomans and they also claimed Islamic leadership on a different basis.

Political hostilities and distrust would eventually lead  the Wahhabis and the Ottomans to declare mutual exchanges of Takfir (excommunication), many years after Ibn 'Abd al-Wahhab's death. By the 1790s, the Muwahhidun had consolidated their rule over most regions of Central Arabia. The growing Wahhabi influence alarmed Ghaleb, the Sharif of Mecca, who responded by initiating warfare with the Saudis in 1793; until his surrender in 1803. Intending to form an armed coalition to defeat the Muwahhidun, he corresponded with the Ottoman authorities in Istanbul and sought to turn them hostile against his rivals by portraying them as disbelievers. Similar overtures were also made by the Pasha of Baghdad. Such reports eventually succeeded in turning the Ottoman bureaucratic opinion significantly hostile against the Wahhabis. In 1797, Sulayman Pasha, the Ottoman governor of Iraq, invaded Diriyah with around 15,000 troops in co-ordination with Sharif Ghalib and laid a one-month siege to Al-Ahsa. However, re-inforcements led by Saud ibn 'Abd al-Azeez would force the Ottomans to retreat. After three days of skirmish, Sulayman Pasha and the Saudis came to a peace settlement which was to last for six years. However, the peace would be broken in 1801, when a caravan of pilgrims protected by a Saudi convoy was plundered near Hail; upon orders from the Ottoman administration in Baghdad. This attack would completely break down the already deteriorating Saudi-Ottoman diplomatic relations, and the Emirate of Dirʿiyya sent a large-scale expedition towards Iraq.

In 1802, 12,000 Wahhabis sacked Karbala in Iraq killing up to 5,000 people and plundering the Imam Husayn Shrine. Saudi forces led by 'Abd al Aziz entered Mecca in 1803 after defeating Ghalib ibn Musa'id, the Sharif of Mecca. The assassination in November 1803 of Saudi Emir ‘Abd al-‘Aziz during prayers in al-Dir‘iyya by an Iraqi; was suspected of being orchestrated by the Ottoman governor of Baghdad, which greatly deteriorated the Saudi-Ottoman relations. Sharif Ghalib had worked hard to dampen the prospects of reconciliation between the Emirate of Diriyah and Ottoman Empire. In the ensuing conflict, the Wahhabis had controlled Mecca and Medina by 1805. The Wahhabis also attacked Ottoman trade caravans which interrupted the Ottoman finances.

After a phony war which lasted years, an all-out war erupted between the Ottomans and the Saudis; initiated by the invasion of the Hijaz by the Ottoman Governor of Egypt Muhammad ‘Ali (d.1849), at the orders of the Ottoman Sultan Mahmud II in 1811. This would herald the beginning of the Wahhabi wars (1811–1818) which resulted in the destruction of the Emirate of Diriyah. The Saudi amir denounced the Ottoman sultan and called into question the validity of his claim to be caliph and guardian of the sanctuaries of the Hejaz. In response, the Ottoman Empire ordered their ambitious vassal, Muhammad Ali of Egypt, to attack the Wahhabi state. Ali had embarked on an extensive modernisation program that included a significant expansion of Egypt's military forces. The Ottomans had grown increasingly wary of Ali's reign; ordering him to go to war with the Wahhabi state would serve their interests regardless as the destruction of either would be beneficial to them. Tensions between Muhammad Ali and his troops also prompted him to send them to Arabia and fight against the Wahhabi movement where many died.

Campaigns
Muhammad Ali was ordered to crush the Saudi state as early as December 1807 by Sultan Mustafa IV, however internal strife within Egypt prevented him from giving his full attention to the Wahhabis. The Ottoman troops were not able to recapture the holy cities until 1811.

In 1815, one of the main rebels, Bakhroush bin Alass of Zahran tribe, was killed and beheaded by Muhammad Ali forces in Al Qunfudhah. In the spring of 1815, Ottoman forces inflicted large-scale  defeat upon the Saudis, forcing them to conclude a  peace treaty. Under the terms of  treaty, the Saudis had to let go of Hijaz. Abdullah ibn Saud was forced to acknowledge himself as the vassal of the Ottoman Empire and obey the Turkish Sultan unquestionably. However, neither Muhammad Ali nor the Ottoman Sultan had confirmed the treaty.

Suspicious of Abdullah, the Wahhabi Emir, the Ottomans resumed the war in 1816, with the assistance of French military instructors. The Egyptian troops were led by Muhammad Ali's elder son, Ibrahim Pasha, and penetrated into the heart of Central Arabia, besieging the chief centres of Qasim  and Najd. Waging a war of extermination between 1816 and 1818, the invading armies pillaged various towns and villages, forcing the inhabitants to flee and seek refuge in remote regions and oases. By 1817, the armies had overrun Rass, Buraida and Unayza. Saudi armies put up a fierce resistance at Al-Rass where they withstood a siege of 3 months. Faced  with the advance of Egyptian Ottomans, Abdullah,  the Saudi  Emir retreated to Diriya.

En route to Dariyya, the Ottoman armies executed everyone over ten years age in Dhurma. Ibrahim's forces would march towards Diriyya during the early months of 1818, easily routing Saudi resistances and arrive at the capital by April 1818. The Siege would last until September 1818, with the Ottoman forces waiting for Saudi supplies to run out. On 11 September 1818, Abdullah Ibn Saud would sue for peace, offering his surrender, in exchange for sparing Diriyya. However, Al Diriyya would be razed to ground under orders of Ibrahim Pasha.

It was not until September 1818 that the Wahhabi state ended with the surrendering of its leaders and the head of the Wahhabi state, Abdullah bin Saud, who was sent to Istanbul to be executed. Thus, the Emirate of Diriyah formally ended with the surrendering of its leaders and the head of the Wahhabi state, Abdullah bin Saud, was taken captive and sent to Istanbul. In December, Emir Abdullah ibn Saud was executed with the public display of his corpse, upon the orders of the Ottoman Sultan.

The British empire welcomed Ibrahim Pasha's siege of Dariyya with the goal of promoting trade interests in the region. Captain George Forster Sadleir, an officer of the British Army in India was dispatched from Bombay to consult with Ibrahim Pasha in Dariyya.

Aftermath
George Forster Sadleir left a record on the aftermath of the former capital of the First Saudi state:

"The site of Deriah is in a deep ravine north-west of Munfooah, about ten miles distant. It is now in ruins, and the inhabitants who were spared, or escaped from the slaughter, have principally sought shelter here ... Munfooah ... was surrounded with a wall and ditch which the Pacha ordered to be razed .... Riad is not so well peopled .... The inhabitants were at that time in a more wretched state than at any prior period since the establishment of the power of the Wahabees. Their walls, the chief security for their property, had been razed ... The year's crop had been consumed by the Turkish force"Saudi ruler 'Abdullah ibn Saud was transported first to Cairo and then to Istanbul, wherein he was beheaded alongside several other Wahhabi Imams. Other than 'Abdullah, most of the political leaders were treated well but the Ottomans were far harsher with the religious leaders that inspired the Wahhabi movement, executing Sūlayman ibn 'Abd Allah Aal-Shaykh and other religious notables, as they were thought to be uncompromising in their beliefs and therefore a much bigger threat than political leaders. The executions were also motivated by Ottoman resentment of Wahhabist views.

After the Destruction of Diriyya, Ibrahim Pasha rounded up the prominent survivors of the Saudi family and the scholarly Al ash-Sheikh many of whom were deported to Egypt. As per Ottoman estimates, over 250 members related to the Saudi family and 32 members related to the Al ash-Sheikh were exiled. Ottomans were far harsher with the religious leaders that inspired the Wahhabi movement, than with the members of the Saudi family. Prominent scholars such as the Qadi of Dir'iyya, Sulayman ibn 'Abd Allah (the grandson of Muhammad ibn Abdul-Wahhaab) were tortured, forced to listen to guitar (knowing the Najdi prescriptions and customs that prohibited music) and executed by a firing-squad. Other ulema such as Abd Allah ibn Muhammad Aal Al-Shaikh and his nephew Abd al Rahman ibn Hasan Aal Al-Shaikh would be exiled to Egypt. (the latter would return to Najd in 1825, to revive and lead the Wahhabi movement). Some other Qadis and scholars were hunted down and executed. Abd al Aziz ibn Hamad al Mu'ammar managed to settle in Bahrain, where the ruler welcomed him. Few scholars managed to escape to the remote Southern corners of Arabia.  The executions reflected the deep Ottoman resentment of Wahhabi movement and also how seriously they viewed its threat. Altogether, the Najdis lost about two dozen scholars and men from the ulema families in the aftermath of the invasion. However, the suppression of Wahhabites in Central Arabia ultimately proved to be a failed campaign.

Later, Ibrahim Pasha and his troops went on to conquer Qatif and el-Hasa. Remnants of Saudi fortifications were demolished across Najd. Emir's relatives and important Wahhabi leaders were made captives and sent to Egypt. In December 1819, Ibrahim Pasha returned to Egypt after formally incorporating Hejaz into the Ottoman Empire. However, they were unable to totally subdue the opposition forces and Central Arabia became a region of permanent Wahhabi uprisings. In the 1820s, Prince Turki ibn 'Abd Allah ibn Muhammed ibn Saud , gathering growing support from tribes and groups that opposed the Turkish occupation, would lay Siege to Riyadh in 1823. By August 1824, Saudi forces would capture Riyadh in a Second Siege, thus establishing the Second Saudi State with Riyadh as its capital.

Following the fall of Emirate of Dirʿiyya, the British empire launched their Persian Gulf campaign of 1819. A formidable force consisting of 2,800 British soldiers and 3 warships fought the Qasimi tribesmen allied to Dir'iyya. Their city Ras al Khaimah was demolished in 1819. The General Maritime treaty was concluded in 1820 with the local chieftains, which would eventually transform them into a protectorate of Trucial States; heralding a century of British supremacy in the Gulf.

This war had formed the basic hatred of the Wahhabi movement amongst the Ottomans, and continues to influence modern Turkey where – in many Turkish Islamic preachers consider Wahhabism to be un-Islamic. The Saudis, who would form the nation a century later, considered it as the first struggle for independence from the Ottoman Empire, and continued to view Turkey with suspicion. The current state of Saudi-Turkey relations are still influenced by this hostile past. To the present day, both Saudi and Turkish nationalist writers accuse each other of engaging in systematic campaigns to rewrite history.

See also 
 Fitnat al-Wahhabiyya
 Nejd Expedition
 Hadith of Najd
 Saudi Arabia–Turkey relations

References 

 
19th century in Saudi Arabia
Egypt under the Muhammad Ali dynasty
History of Nejd
Military campaigns involving the Ottoman Empire
Wars involving Saudi Arabia
Wars involving the Ottoman Empire
1810s in Egypt
1810s in Asia
Religion-based wars
Sharifate of Mecca
Mahmud II